Annitella is a genus of caddisflies belonging to the family Limnephilidae. It was introduced by Czech entomologist  in 1907 and named for his wife Anně.

The species of this genus are found in Europe.

Species
Species in this genus include:

References

Limnephilidae
Insects of Europe
Trichoptera genera